A Burschenschaft (sometimes abbreviated  in the German Burschenschaft jargon;) is one of the traditional  (student associations) of Germany, Austria, and Chile (the latter due to German cultural influence).
Burschenschaften were founded in the 19th century as associations of university students inspired by liberal and nationalistic ideas.
They were significantly involved in the March Revolution and the unification of Germany.
After the formation of the German Empire in 1871, they faced a crisis, as their main political objective had been realized. So-called  were established, but these were dissolved by the Nazi regime in 1935/6. Roughly 160  exist today in Germany, Austria and Chile.

History

Origins

The very first one, called  ("original "), was founded on 12 June 1815 at Jena as an association drawn from all German university  students inspired by liberal and patriotic ideas. Like the Landsmannschaften or the Corps, a student association based on particular German region, the Burschenschaft members also engaged in duelling. However, its main purpose was to break down society lines and to destroy rivalry in the student body, to improve student life and increase patriotism. It was intended to draw its members from a broader population base than the Corps. Indeed, the group was known for its middle-class membership while the Corps' was mainly aristocratic. At first, a significant component of its membership were students who had taken part in the German wars of liberation against the Napoleonic occupation of Germany.

Its motto was “honor, freedom, fatherland”, and the original colors were red-black-red (what would become the national colours of Germany) with a golden oak leaves cluster, which might be based on the uniform of the Lützow Free Corps, being a corps of volunteer soldiers during the wars of liberation.

19th century
The  were student associations that engaged in numerous social activities. However, their most important goal was to foster loyalty to the concept of a united German national state as well as strong engagement for freedom, rights, and democracy. Quite often  decided to stress extreme nationalist or sometimes also liberal ideas, leading in time to the exclusion of Jews, who were considered to be un-German. Nevertheless, all  were banned as revolutionary by Klemens Wenzel von Metternich of Austria when he issued the reactionary Carlsbad Decrees in 1819.

After this revolution had been suppressed, plenty of leading , such as Friedrich Hecker and Carl Schurz, went abroad. After the foundation of the German Empire in 1871, the  movement faced a severe crisis, as one major goal had been achieved to some extent: German unification. It was also during this time until the 1890s when many members turned increasingly towards anti-Semitic outlook believing it provided an approach to achieving the fraternity's fundamental goal. Such members viewed the Jews as a problem that hampered the unification of Germany and the achievement of new values the organization advanced. There were members who resigned to protest a resolution adopted at an Eisenach meeting declaring that Burschenschaft "have no Jewish members and do not plan to have any in the future."

Interbellum and Nazi Germany
Some Nazis (e.g.
However, he resigned two years after he joined because of the fraternity's antisemitism.

Postwar
While in communist East Germany  were prohibited as representatives of a bourgeois attitude to be extinguished, in West Germany most  were refounded in the 1950s. Some of them had to be transferred into other cities, since Germany had lost great parts of its territories after the Second World War, and many  from East Germany also tried to find a new home. The allied victors had forbidden refounding  originally, but this could not be upheld in a liberal surrounding. In the 1990s many  that had left Eastern Germany in the 1940s and 1950s returned to their traditional home universities in the East.

Today
Roughly 160  still exist today and many are organized in different organizations ranging from progressive to nationalistic. While the  still insists upon Fichte's idea of a German nation based on language, thought and culture, the  favors defining Germany as the political Germany established by the German Basic Law (constitution) in 1949 and altered by the 1990 unification. Many  are not organized at all since they do not see an organization that represents their values sufficiently.

Academic fencing is still an important part of their self-understanding as well as political education.

Many , often found in certain "umbrella" organisations (such as the ), are associated with right-wing or far-right ideas, in particular with the wish for a German state encompassing Austria.
Reportedly half of member clubs threatened to leave in a row over proposed ID cards and a decision to label an opponent of Adolf Hitler a "traitor".
Many of the  that left the Deutsche Burschenschaft following this were later involved in the founding of a new organization, the

Notable  members

 Otto Abel (1824–1854)
 Erich Adickes (1866–1928)
 Victor Adler (1852–1918)
 Heinrich Ahrens (1808–1874)
 Wilhelm Altmann (1862–1951)
 Otto Antonius (1885–1945)
 Rudolf Arndt (1835–1900)
 Ludwig Arndts von Arnesberg (1803–1878)
 Jürgen Aschoff (1913–1998)
 Ludwig Aschoff (1866–1942)
Friedrich Wilhelm Nietzsche (1844-1900)
 Berthold Auerbach (1812–1882)
 Hans von und zu Aufseß (1801–1872)
 Hermann Bahr (1863–1934)
 Franz Bäke (1898–1978)
 Erwin Bälz (1849–1913)
 Ludwig Bamberger (1823–1899)
 Dietrich Barfurth (1849–1927)
 Hermann Baumgarten (1825–1893)
 Karl Theodor Bayrhoffer (1812–1888)
 Ludwig Bechstein (1801–1860)
 Karl Isidor Beck (1817–1879)
 Hermann Heinrich Becker (1820–1885)
 Wilhelm Beiglböck (1905–1963)
 Hans Berger (1873–1941)
 Robert Bernardis (1908–1944)
 Georg Beseler (1809–1888)
 Max Bezzel (1824–1871)
 Adalbert Bezzenberger (1851–1922)
 Karl Biedermann (1812–1901)
 Helmut Bischoff (1908–1993)
 Karl Blind (1826–1907)
 Kurt Blome (1894–1969)
 Hans Blum (1841–1910)
 Robert Blum (1807–1848)
 Hans-Friedrich Blunck (1888–1961)
 Franz Boas (1858–1942)
 Otto Böckel (1859–1923)
 Ehrenfried-Oskar Boege (1889–1965)
 Ernst Wilhelm Bohle (1903–1960)
 Herbert Böhme (1907–1971)
 Carl Bosch (1874–1940)
 Erich Brandenburg (1868–1946)
 Rudolf Breitscheid (1874–1944)
 Heinrich Karl Brugsch (1827–1894)
 Alfred Buntru (1887–1974)
 Franz Josef Ritter von Buß (1803–1878)
 Paul Carell (1911–1997)
 Friedrich Wilhelm Carové (1789–1852)
 Moritz Carrière (1817–1895)
 Hans Gerhard Creutzfeldt (1885–1964)
 Johann Nepomuk Czermak (1828–1873)
 Adalbert Czerny (1863–1941)
 Kurt Daluege (1897–1946)
 Georg Friedrich Daumer (1800–1875)
 Eduard David (1863–1930)
 Kurt H. Debus (1908–1983)
 Richard Dedekind (1831–1916)
 Richard Dehmel (1863–1920)
 Franz Josef Delonge (1927–1988)
 Heinrich Dernburg (1829–1907)
 Paul Deussen (1845–1919)
 Ernst Dieffenbach (1811–1855)
 Kai Diekmann (born 1964)
 Eberhard Diepgen (born 1941)
 Martin Disteli (1802–1844)
 Anton von Doblhoff-Dier (1800–1872)
 Albert Döderlein (1860–1941)
 August Heinrich Hermann von Dönhoff (1797–1874)
 Max Dortu (1826–1849) 
 August Dresbach (1894–1968) 
 Henri Druey (1799–1855)
 Max Duncker (1811–1886)
 Irmfried Eberl (1910–1948)
 Victor von Ebner (1842–1925)
 Rudolf Eisenmenger (1902–1994)
 Adolf Erman (1854–1937)
 Abraham Esau (1884–1955)
 Hermann Esser (1900–1981)
 Rudolf Eucken (1846–1926)
 Otto Fahr (1892–1969)
 Johannes Falke (1823–1876)
 Ferdinand Falkson (1820–1900)
 Wilhelm Feddersen (1832–1918)
 Georg Fein (1803–1869)
 Friedrich Feuerbach (1806–1880)
 Karl Wilhelm Feuerbach (1800–1834)
 Julius von Ficker (1826–1902)
 Hans Fischer (1881–1945)
 Wilhelm Fleischmann (1837–1920)
 Walther Flemming (1843–1905)
 Walter Flex (1887–1917)
 Richard Foerster (1843–1922)
 August Ludwig Follen (1794–1855)
 Charles Follen (1796–1840)
 Paul Follen (1799–1844)
 August Föppl (1854–1924)
 Peter Wilhelm Forchhammer (1801–1894)
 Heinrich Förster (1800–1881)
 Karl Emil Franzos (1848–1904)
 Heinrich Friedjung (1851–1920)
 Ludwig Friedländer (1824–1909)
 Max Friedländer (1829–1872)
 Julius Fröbel (1805–1893)
 Emil Frommel (1828–1896)
 Reinhard Furrer (1940–1995)
 Friedrich von Gagern (1794–1848)
 Heinrich von Gagern (1799–1880)
 Max von Gagern (1810–1889)
 Jürgen Gansel (born 1974)
 Friedrich Heinrich Geffcken (1830–1896)
 Emanuel Geibel (1815–1884)
 Hans Geiger (1882–1945)
 Edgar von Gierke (1877–1945)
 Otto von Gierke (1841–1921)
 Gerd Gies (born 1943)
 Otto Gildemeister (1823–1902)
 Rudolf von Gneist (1816–1895)
 Friedrich Goltz (1834–1902)
 Heinrich Göppert (1800–1884)
 Rudolf von Gottschall (1823–1909)
 Adolf Gottstein (1857–1941)`
 Carl Graebe (1841–1927)
 Fritz Graebner (1877–1934)
 Martin Graf (born 1960)
 Maximilian Gritzner (1843–1902)
 Karl Groos (1861–1946)
 Bernhard von Gudden (1824–1886)
 Eugen Gura (1842–1906)
 Alfred Gürtler (1875–1933)
 Karl Gutzkow (1811–1878)
 Friedrich Haase (1808–1867)
 Karl Hagen (1810–1868)
 Jörg Haider (1950–2008)
 Adolf von Harleß (1806–1879)
 Wilhelm von Hartel (1839–1907)
 Karl Hase (1800–1890)
 Ludwig Hassenpflug (1794–1862)
 Wilhelm Hauff (1802–1827)
 Johann Hauler (1829–1888)
 Otto Haupt (1887–1988)
 Adolph Hausrath (1837–1909)
 Ludwig Häusser (1818–1867)
 Rudolf Haym (1821–1901)
 Johann Gustav Heckscher (1797–1865)
 Ernst Heinkel (1888–1958)
 Kurt Heißmeyer (1905–1967) 
 Wolfgang Helbig (1839–1915) 
 Fritz Hellwig (born 1912)
 Ernst Wilhelm Hengstenberg (1802–1869)
 Gottlieb August Herrich-Schäffer (1799–1874)
 Heinrich Hertz (1857–1894)
 Georg Herwegh (1817–1875)
 Theodor Herzl (1860–1904)
 William Hexamer (1825–1870)
 Eduard Heyck (1862–1941)
 Carl Hierholzer (1840–1871)
 Bruno Hildebrand (1812–1878)
 Franz Hilgendorf (1839–1904)
 Heinrich Himmler (1900–1945)
 Hans Hinkel (1901–1960)
 Hermann Höcherl (1912–1989)
 August Heinrich Hoffmann von Fallersleben (1798–1874)
 Norbert Hofer (born 1971)
 Otto Höfler (1901–1987)
 Johann Wilhelm Friedrich Höfling (1802–1853)
 Johann Christian Konrad von Hofmann (1810–1877)
 Robert Hohlbaum (1886–1955)
 Karl von Holtei (1798–1880)
 Gerd Honsik (born 1941)
 Hermann Höpker-Aschoff (1883–1954)
 Leslie Hore-Belisha, 1st Baron Hore-Belisha (1893–1957)
 Hermann von Ihering (1850–1930)
 Carl Ernst Jarcke (1801–1852)
 Karl Jarres (1874–1951)
 Curt Joël (1865–1945)
 Karl Jordan (1861–1959)
 Franz Jung (1888–1963)
 Philipp Wilhelm Jung (1884–1965)
 Rudolf Jung (1882–1945)
 Franz Joseph Damian Junghanns (1800–1875)
 Hugo Jury (1887–1945)
Peter Kaiser (1793–1864)
 Ernst Kaltenbrunner (1903-1946)
 Lorenz Franz Kielhorn (1840-1908) 
 Gustav Koerner (1809–1896)
 Friedrich Lange (1852–1917)
 Otto Lubarsch (1860–1933)
 Francis Lieber (1800–1871)
 Theodor Mommsen 
 Hans Mühlenfeld (1901–1969)
 Henry Bradford Nason (1831–1895) 
 Franz Overbeck (1837–1905) 
 Heinz Reinefarth (1903-1979)
 Karl Sack (1896–1945)
 Karl Ludwig Sand (1795–1820)
 Carl Schurz (1829–1906)
 Otto Skorzeny (1908-1975)
 Lorenz von Stein
 Gustav Stresemann
 Adalbert J. Volck (1828–1912)

See also
The Revolutions of 1848 in the German states — ( were student groups which played a part in beginning of the Prussian Revolution)
Hep-Hep riots
Karl Ludwig Sand
Dueling scars

Further reading

External links

 Information on the 
 English information about the

References

Student societies in Germany
1815 establishments in Germany